Ian Blair Fallis (26 January 1954 – 3 October 1977) was a Scottish footballer who played as a forward.

Fallis started his career with Queen's Park before moving to Kilmarnock in 1974 where he scored 24 goals in 81 appearances.

Fallis, who latterly lived at Chryston, Lanarkshire, died in Glasgow Royal Infirmary aged 23 on 3 October 1977 as a result of a car accident in a three vehicle collision at Coatbridge.

References

External links
Profile at QPFC.com - A historical Queen's Park website

1954 births
1977 deaths
Queen's Park F.C. players
Kilmarnock F.C. players
Footballers from Glasgow
Scottish footballers
Scottish Football League players
Association football forwards
Scotland amateur international footballers
Road incident deaths in Scotland